Mount Quincy Adams (alternate Name Boundary Peak 163) is a mountain located on the border between United States and Canada. It is named after John Quincy Adams (1767–1848), the sixth president of the United States.

The southern and eastern flanks of the mountain are in Glacier Bay National Park, in Hoonah-Angoon Census Area, Alaska. The northern and northwestern flanks are in Tatshenshini-Alsek Park, in Stikine Region, British Columbia, making it the second highest peak in B.C. Mount Quincy Adams is flanked to the west by Mount Fairweather .

References

External links
  Canadian Mountain Encyclopedia: Quincy Adams

Mountains of Alaska
Four-thousanders of British Columbia
Saint Elias Mountains
Mountains of Glacier Bay National Park and Preserve
Landforms of Hoonah–Angoon Census Area, Alaska
Canada–United States border
International mountains of North America
Mountains of Unorganized Borough, Alaska